Prior to the first season of the National Hockey League (NHL), which commenced on December 19, 1917, there had been many seasons of ice hockey played by various amateur and professional leagues, often held contemporaneously, going back to the 1880s, to which the NHL can trace its roots. Below is a list of pre-NHL seasons by ice hockey leagues that are precursors of the National Hockey League.

Amateur and professional leagues

Notes
The Montreal Winter Carnival ice hockey tournaments (MWCT) were a series of annual tournaments held in the 1880s in conjunction with the Montreal Winter Carnival, in Montreal, Quebec, Canada. First held in 1883, these tournaments are considered to be the first championship ice hockey tournaments and the predecessor to the first championship ice hockey league, the Amateur Hockey Association of Canada.
The Amateur Hockey Association of Canada (AHAC) existed from 1886 to 1898. Season series play started in 1893.
 The Manitoba Hockey Association existed from 1892 to 1923. The association organized the Manitoba Professional Hockey League in 1906.
The Canadian Amateur Hockey League  (CAHL) existed from 1899 to 1905.
The Federal Amateur Hockey League  (FAHL/FHL) existed from 1904 to 1909. The league was professional from 1908 onwards.
The Eastern Canada Amateur Hockey Association (ECAHA) existed from 1906 to 1909. The league allowed professional players from 1907 onwards, becoming fully professional in the 1909 season.
The Western Pennsylvania Hockey League (WPHL) existed from 1896 to 1909. It was the first league to officially allow professional players.
The International Professional Hockey League (IPHL) existed from 1904 until 1907.
The Ontario Professional Hockey League (OPHL) existed from 1908 until 1911.
The Canadian Hockey Association (CHA) existed in 1910 for part of one season.
The National Hockey Association (NHA) existed from 1910 to 1917.
The Pacific Coast Hockey Association (PCHA) existed from 1911 to 1924.
The Western Canada Hockey League (WCHL) existed from 1921 to 1926. While the WCHL wasn't a pre-NHL league, it is generally deemed by hockey historians to have been a major league. Two years prior to its folding, the PCHA merged with it. The last season, 1925–26, it had been renamed the Western Hockey League because one of its teams had moved to the United States. The NHL would buy the rights to the WHL players as part of its disbanding.
Prior to 1905 (FAHL), 1910 (NHA) and 1912 (PCHA) league play started in January and ended in March of one calendar year.
 The Stanley Cup was first awarded in 1893.
 Prior to 1915, championships could be won or lost during a season through challenge play. Hence, multiple championship holders were possible during each season.

See also
 List of Stanley Cup champions
 List of NHL seasons
 List of WHA seasons